His Bonded Wife is a lost 1918 silent film comedy drama directed by Charles Brabin and starring Emmy Wehlen. It was produced by Maxwell Karger and distributed through Metro Pictures.

Cast
Emmy Wehlen as Doris Morse
Frank Currier as Digby Morse
Creighton Hale as Philip Hazard
John Terry as Tom Lloyd
Wanda Howard as Kate
William Frederick

References

External links

1918 films
American silent feature films
Films directed by Charles Brabin
Lost American films
American black-and-white films
1910s English-language films
1918 comedy-drama films
1918 lost films
Lost comedy-drama films
1910s American films
Silent American comedy-drama films